Pristimantis thectopternus, commonly called the Northern Cordilleras robber frog, is a species of frog in the family Strabomantidae. It is endemic to Colombia.
Its natural habitats are tropical moist montane forests, plantations, rural gardens, and heavily degraded former forest.

References

thectopternus
Endemic fauna of Colombia
Amphibians of Colombia
Amphibians described in 1965
Taxonomy articles created by Polbot